Xunmenglong (from ) is a genus of compsognathid theropod dinosaur from the Huajiying Formation from Hebei Province in China. The type and only species is Xunmenglong yinliangis. The holotype material consists of a pelvis, tail base and hindlimbs that had previously been part of a chimera containing three different animals. The animal is described as being the smallest known member of Compsognathidae, being about the size of the sub-adult Scipionyx holotype specimen or approximately 0.5 meters (1.6 feet) in length.

References

Compsognathids
Hauterivian life
Early Cretaceous dinosaurs of Asia
Cretaceous China
Fossil taxa described in 2019